New Dawn may refer to:

Entertainment
Civilization: A New Dawn, a 2017 strategy board game
Far Cry New Dawn, a 2019 video game
MS Saga: A New Dawn, a 2005 video game
A New Dawn, a 2003 science fiction short story collection by Robert Campbell
"New Dawn", a 1999 song by Linda Perry, covered by Celine Dion in 2007 on Taking Chances
"New Dawn", a 2009 song by Withered Hand from Good News
New Dawn (album), a 2008 album by Libera
New Dawn (film), a 1999 French film
Star Wars: A New Dawn, a 2014 novel by John Jackson Miller

Newspapers and magazines
Fiji Focus or New Dawn, a Fiji bi-monthly newspaper
The New Dawn, a Liberian newspaper
Yeni Şafak ("New Dawn"), a conservative Turkish daily newspaper
New Dawn, an Australian magazine previously published under the title Dawn (magazine)

Others
Intelsat 28, formerly New Dawn, a communications satellite
New Dawn (Algeria), a nationalist and conservative political party formed in 2012
A New Dawn in the Negev, a Bedouin-Jewish NGO based in Rahat, Israel

See also
Operation New Dawn (disambiguation)